known as  in Japan, is a pseudo-3D rail shooter released as an arcade video game by Sega in 1982. The player controls a spaceship in a third-person perspective, adapting the three-dimensional perspective of Sega's earlier racing game Turbo (1981) for the space shoot 'em up genre. It used the Buck Rogers license, referencing the space battles, though Buck himself is never seen.

The arcade game debuted at the Amusement & Music Operators Association (AMOA) show, held during November 18–20, 1982, where it was considered one of the show's best games and a milestone for demonstrating the potential of 3D shoot 'em up gameplay. Ports were released for the SG-1000, Atari 2600, Atari 5200, Atari 8-bit family, Coleco Adam, ColecoVision, Intellivision, MSX, Commodore 64, VIC-20, TI-99/4A, Apple II, and ZX Spectrum. The IBM PC version uses CGA graphics. The ColecoVision version was released in April 1984.

Gameplay

Reception

Arcade version
In the United States, it was among the thirteen highest-grossing arcade games of 1983. In Japan, Game Machine listed Zoom 909 on their June 1, 1985 issue as being the thirteenth most-successful upright/cockpit arcade unit of the month.

The arcade game received positive reviews from critics. American magazine Video Games gave it a highly positive review following its AMOA 1982 debut, ranking it the second best game of the show. They called it a "gorgeous, 3-D game that deserves the" moniker "Space Turbo" with "high-quality graphics" and "fast and furious" action. They concluded, "Say goodbye to Galaga—shoot-'em-ups will be 3-D from now on."

French magazine Tilt, in its May 1983 issue, rated the arcade game six out of six stars. British magazine Computer and Video Games also gave it a positive review, noting the behind-the-ship perspective, comparing the opening tunnel section to the Death Star battle in the film Star Wars (1977), and stating that anyone "who has enjoyed the" Buck Rogers "TV series will be interested to see just how it converts to the video screen!"

Home conversions
Michael Blanchet for Electronic Fun with Computers & Games reviewed the Coleco Adam version, stating: "After playing Buck Rogers a scant fifty times, I noticed an ever-increasing number of on-screen glitches. I can only presume they were caused by tape wear."

Dan Hallassey for Ahoy! reviewed the Commodore 64 and VIC-20 versions, stating: "Graphics and gameplay combine to make this an excellent and absorbing – though admittedly one-note – space game."

Other reviews

Your Spectrum — September 1985
TeleMatch — January 1984 (Atari 8-bit, Commodore 64, VIC-20)
Popular Computing Weekly — July 18, 1985
Zzap! — May 1985 (Commodore 64)
All Game Guide — 1998

Legacy
Planet of Zoom went on to influence the 1985 Sega game, Space Harrier, which in turn influenced Nintendo's 1993 game, Star Fox.

Notes

References

1982 video games
Arcade video games
Atari 2600 games
Atari 5200 games
Atari 8-bit family games
ColecoVision games
Commodore 64 games
Gremlin Industries games
MSX games
Rail shooters
Sega arcade games
SG-1000 games
Third-person shooters
Video games developed in Japan
Video games set on fictional planets
ZX Spectrum games